, 83 Global Positioning System navigation satellites have been built: 31 are launched and operational, 3 are unhealthy or in reserve, 42 are retired, 2 were lost during launch, and 1 prototype was never launched. 4 Block III satellites have completed construction and have been declared "Available For Launch" (AFL). The constellation requires a minimum of 24 operational satellites, and allows for up to 32; typically, 31 are operational at any one time. A GPS receiver needs four satellites to work out its position in three dimensions.

SVNs are "space vehicle numbers" which are serial numbers assigned to each GPS satellite. PRNs are the "pseudo-random noise" sequences, or Gold codes, that each satellite transmits to differentiate itself from other satellites in the active constellation.

After being launched, GPS satellites enter a period of testing before their signals are set to "Healthy". During normal operations, certain signals may be set to "Unhealthy" to accommodate updates or testing. After decommissioning, most GPS satellites become on-orbit spares and may be recommissioned if needed. Permanently retired satellites are sent to a higher, less congested disposal orbit where their fuel is vented, batteries are intentionally depleted and communication is switched off.

Satellites

Satellites by launch date

Satellites by block

Orbital slots (by SVN) 
Refer to GPS Constellation Status for the most up-to-date information.

Numbers in parentheses refer to non-operational satellites.

Once launched, GPS satellites do not change their plane assignment but slot assignments are somewhat arbitrary and are subject to change.

PRN status by satellite block 
, 31 of 32 PRNs are in use; PRNs 22 is unavailable. Three additional satellites, including one not assigned a PRN, are designated as on-orbit spares.

PRN to SVN history 
This section is for the purpose of making it possible to determine the PRN associated with a SVN at a particular epoch. For example, SVN 049 had been assigned PRNs 01, 24, 27, and 30 at different times of its lifespan, whereas PRN 01 had been assigned to SVNs 032, 037, 049, 035, and 063 at different epochs. This information can be found in the IGS ANTEX file, which uses the convention "GNN" and "GNNN" for PRNs and SVNs, respectively. For example, SVN 049 is described as:
BLOCK IIR-M         G01                 G049      2009-014A TYPE / SERIAL NO    
  2009     3    24     0     0    0.0000000                 VALID FROM          
  2011     5     6    23    59   59.9999999                 VALID UNTIL         
BLOCK IIR-M         G24                 G049      2009-014A TYPE / SERIAL NO    
  2012     2     2     0     0    0.0000000                 VALID FROM          
  2012     3    14    23    59   59.9999999                 VALID UNTIL         
BLOCK IIR-M         G24                 G049      2009-014A TYPE / SERIAL NO    
  2012     8     9     0     0    0.0000000                 VALID FROM          
  2012     8    22    23    59   59.9999999                 VALID UNTIL         
BLOCK IIR-M         G27                 G049      2009-014A TYPE / SERIAL NO    
  2012    10    18     0     0    0.0000000                 VALID FROM          
  2013     5     9    23    59   59.9999999                 VALID UNTIL         
BLOCK IIR-M         G30                 G049      2009-014A TYPE / SERIAL NO    
  2013     5    10     0     0    0.0000000                 VALID FROM          
whereas for PRN 01 the following excerpt is relevant:
BLOCK IIA           G01                 G032      1992-079A TYPE / SERIAL NO    
  1992    11    22     0     0    0.0000000                 VALID FROM          
  2008    10    16    23    59   59.9999999                 VALID UNTIL         
BLOCK IIA           G01                 G037      1993-032A TYPE / SERIAL NO    
  2008    10    23     0     0    0.0000000                 VALID FROM          
  2009     1     6    23    59   59.9999999                 VALID UNTIL         
BLOCK IIR-M         G01                 G049      2009-014A TYPE / SERIAL NO    
  2009     3    24     0     0    0.0000000                 VALID FROM          
  2011     5     6    23    59   59.9999999                 VALID UNTIL         
BLOCK IIA           G01                 G035      1993-054A TYPE / SERIAL NO    
  2011     6     2     0     0    0.0000000                 VALID FROM          
  2011     7    12    23    59   59.9999999                 VALID UNTIL         
BLOCK IIF           G01                 G063      2011-036A TYPE / SERIAL NO    
  2011     7    16     0     0    0.0000000                 VALID FROM          
A table extracted out of the ANTEX file is made available by the Bernese GNSS Software.

Planned launches

Block III

Block IIIF

See also 

 List of Beidou satellites
 List of Galileo satellites
 List of GLONASS satellites
 List of NAVIC satellites

References

External links 
 Boeing Delta launch schedule
 United States military launch record
 NAVCEN GPS Constellation Status
 NIMA GPS Constellation Status
 UNB GPS Constellation Status
 AGI-CSSI GPS Constellation Status

Global Positioning System
GPS